The Haggin Museum is an art museum and local history museum in Stockton, San Joaquin County, California, located in the city's Victory Park. The museum opened in 1931. Its art collection includes works by European painters Jean Béraud, Rosa Bonheur, William-Adolphe Bouguereau, Jean-Léon Gérôme, and Pierre-Auguste Renoir, landscapes by French artists of the Barbizon school, and sculptures by René de Saint-Marceaux, Alfred Barye, and Auguste Rodin. The museum also features a number of works by Hudson River School and California landscape painters, including the largest collection of Albert Bierstadt works in the region, and in 2017 dedicated a gallery to display the largest public collection of original artworks by J. C. Leyendecker.

History of the building
Upon formation in 1928, the San Joaquin Pioneer and Historical Society listed several objectives in its Articles of Incorporation: to develop educational facilities for the study of history, to collect documents and articles of historical interest, and to establish and maintain a museum where such items could be stored and displayed. Stockton native Robert McKee and his wife, Eila Haggin McKee, offered the group $30,000, with two stipulations: that the museum be named in honor of her late father, Louis Terah Haggin (the son of James Ben Ali Haggin), and that it include galleries to house her parents' art collection. The Louis Terah Haggin Memorial Galleries and San Joaquin Pioneer Historical Museum opened its doors to the public on 14 June 1931, Flag Day.

Upon her death in 1936, though she never visited in person, Eila Haggin McKee left the institution $500,000. Further, to honor her memory, Robert McKee donated funds for the building's first addition, which included storage space on the ground floor and a vestibule and large gallery on the second. When it opened in December 1939, the room now known as the McKee Gallery contained paintings, furniture, and decorative art from the couple's New York residence, and overlooked the rose garden.

In 1948, Stockton architect Howard G. Bissel drew up plans for a 15,500 square foot addition along the western edge of the existing structure. Principal funding came from the estates of Robert McKee and of rancher Jennie Hunter, and a significant gift from Irving Martin, Sr., owner of the Stockton Record. The new exhibit areas, including the California Room, the Jennie Hunter Rooms, the West Gallery, and the lower level Arms Gallery and Vehicle Gallery, opened in 1949.

In 1976, a major gift from William Knox Holt funded construction of a wing named for his father, the Benjamin Holt Wing, with a gallery showcasing Holt's contributions to the mechanization of agriculture, including a restored Holt 75 Caterpillar tractor. The Holt gift also funded construction of environmentally controlled storage facilities, offices, and the museum's library and archive.

In 2017 the museum completed a $2.5 million renovation of its galleries, which included permanent gallery space for displaying a large portion of the museum's extensive collection of the work of J. C. Leyendecker. The museum's three-story building now contains more than 34,000 square feet of exhibition space.

History galleries

The Pioneer Room, the principal history gallery during the museum's early years, displayed artifacts and archival material collected since 1868 by the San Joaquin Society of California Pioneers.

The Victorian furnishings of the Jennie Hunter Rooms evoke life in the Central Valley during the late 19th and early 20th centuries. The contents were bequeathed to the museum by Miss Jennie Hunter, a local rancher, alumna of Mills College, and Daughter of San Joaquin County Pioneers, with the proviso that they be displayed just as they had been arranged in her home. The result is an almost uncanny peek into the past.

Other exhibits focus on Native Americans, the Gold Rush, agriculture in the San Joaquin Valley, historic firefighting equipment, a recreated local flour mill, as well as shipbuilding and other Stockton industries. The displays known as the Storefronts are recreations of businesses and rooms typical of establishments in San Joaquin County between 1890 and 1915, including a one-room schoolhouse and a Chinese herb shop.

Also among the thousands of historical items permanently on display are a World War II jeep and the trunk used by murderess Emma LeDoux in the infamous "trunk murder of 1906."

Art galleries and collection

Eila Haggin McKee's grandfather, the Gold Rush tycoon James Ben Ali Haggin, collected art to decorate the walls of his 61-room Nob Hill mansion. However, it was her father, Louis Terah Haggin, and her mother, San Francisco socialite Blanche Butterworth Haggin, who assembled the majority of the Haggin Collection. Louis and Blanche both spoke fluent French and maintained a residence in Paris, where they entertained artists, writers, and European nobility. Their growing collection came to fill their homes in San Francisco, Paris, and New York City.

Typical of art collections assembled after the Civil War by wealthy Americans, the Haggin Collection reflects the work of conservative Realism painters of the latter part of the 19th century. It is characterized by Louis and Blanche's penchant for landscapes, genre, and animal paintings. They avoided religious or historical paintings. They eschewed the nude, Nymphaeum by William-Adolphe Bouguereau being a notable exception to this rule. And like their contemporaries, the Haggins assembled a collection that was encyclopedic and international in nature, featuring one or two works from a broad sampling of artists. Certain artists were collected in depth, however, including Jean Béraud, Albert Bierstadt, Rosa Bonheur, Jean-Léon Gérôme, Edward Lamson Henry, Barend Cornelis Koekkoek, Eugène Joseph Verboeckhoven and Jehan Georges Vibert. Approximately one-third of the collection is composed of works by American artists and the remaining two-thirds by European painters. Of the European art, French works are the most numerous.

Initially, Mrs. McKee gave the San Joaquin Pioneer and Historical Society 180 paintings, most of them part of the $10 million estate she inherited following the death of her father in March 1929. Both Eila and her husband Robert arranged for additional paintings to be bequeathed to the museum upon their deaths. Today the Haggin Collection totals nearly 240 works, of which approximately 75 are on view in the museum's art galleries at any one time. A catalog of the paintings, The Haggin Collection, compiled and written by Dr. Patricia Sanders, was published in 1991.

A hall between the two European art galleries displays Haggin and McKee family memorabilia, including portraits, photographs, and personal items including one of Eila's evening gowns and the World War I American Red Cross uniform she wore in France.

Although the core of the museum's art collection is derived from gifts from the Haggin and McKee families, it has been significantly augmented through gifts and purchases, including works by American and European artists of the late 19th and early 20th centuries that complement the original Haggin gifts. Notable is Rodin's The Athlete (c. 1901–1904). The museum has also assembled collections of Japanese woodblock prints, illuminated manuscripts, paintings by American illustrators such as J. C. Leyendecker and Maxfield Parrish, and both Western and Asian decorative arts.

Library/Archives

The Haggin Museum's Library/Archives began with material donated to the museum in 1931 by the San Joaquin Society of California Pioneers, comprising a wide-ranging collection of historical artifacts, photographs, ledgers, journals, correspondence, and other ephemera. Today there are some 10,000 volumes in the library. Approximately two-thirds are history related, and one-third deal with art and art history. The latter make up the Earl Rowland Art Library, named in honor of the museum's longest-serving director.

The majority of the history volumes are part of the Almeda Mae Petzinger Library, named after the benefactor who bestowed a generous endowment to help maintain the library in perpetuity. There are more than 600 archival boxes and some 100 flat files filled with photographs, maps, business records, greeting cards, advertising, and other items in the library stack room.  A separate facility, the Betty H. Schroebel Stockton Historic Center, houses materials that relate specifically to the city's past.

The Agricultural & Industrial Archives were established in 1984 with a grant from the William Knox Holt Foundation. The history of Holt Manufacturing Company, the local industry that developed the side-hill combine harvester and the Caterpillar track-type tractor, is documented in photographs, drawings, business records, operators' manuals, and advertising. The Archives also include records and drawings of Stephens Bros. Boat Builders, designers of commercial and pleasure watercraft; material from the Stockton Iron Works, which built dredges that helped construct the San Joaquin River Delta levees; the Tillie Lewis collection, which preserves the history of Stockton's preeminent "Tomato Queen" agri-businesswoman; and material from Sperry Flour Company.

The Haggin's library also includes a large collection of work by Ralph O. Yardley, editorial cartoonist for the Stockton Record from 1922 to 1952. During this long tenure he produced a series of more than 1400 cartoons published weekly under the title "Do You Remember?" that dealt with local homes, businesses, buildings, organizations, special events, and everyday life. The museum has more than 1100 of these nostalgic glimpses into the city's past.

Gallery

References

Further reading
Sanders, Patricia B. The Haggin Collection. Stockton, CA: The Haggin Museum, 1991.

External links

Visitor guide and museum map
Haggin Museum Library/Archives
How did world-renowned paintings come to be located in Stockton?
Fortunes & Family: The Haggin McKee Legacy

Huell Howser visits the Haggin Museum (video)
Haggin Museum at visitstockton.org

Art museums and galleries in California
History museums in California
Museums in San Joaquin County, California
Buildings and structures in Stockton, California
Culture of Stockton, California
History of Stockton, California
Art museums established in 1928
1928 establishments in California